The Roman Catholic Diocese of Cruzeiro do Sul is a suffragan see in the ecclesiastical province of the Metropolitan Archdiocese of Porto Velho, Acre (state), westernmost Amazonian Brazil.

Its cathedral episcopal see is the Marian Catedral Nossa Senhora da Gloria, in the city of Cruzeiro do Sul, Acre.

Statistics 
As per 2014, it pastorally served 230,966 Catholics (80.6% of 286,462 total) on 126,633 km² in 12 parishes and 99 missions with 25 priests (16 diocesan, 9 religious), 91 lay religious (16 brothers, 75 sisters) and 13 seminarians.

History 
 On 22 May 1931, Pope Pius XI established the Territorial Prelature of Juruá, on canonical territory split off from the then Territorial Prelature of Tefé (later Apostolic Prefecture).
 Pope John Paul II elevated the prelature to Diocese of Cruzeiro do Sul on 25 June 1987.

Bishops

Episcopal ordinaries
(Territorial) (Bishop-)Prelates of Juruá
 Heinrich Ritter (bishop), Holy Ghost Fathers (C.S.Sp.) (born Germany) (6 September 1935 - death 19 July 1942), Titular Bishop of Rhosus (1935.09.06 – 1942.07.19)
 Father Henrique Klein (1942 - death 1947) 
 José Hascher, C.S.Sp. (born France) (22 March 1947 - retired 25 February 1967), Titular Bishop of Æliæ (1947.03.22 – death 1973.05.08)
 Heinrich Rüth, C.S.Sp. (7 February 1967 - 25 June 1987), Titular Bishop of Leptiminus (1966.06.21 – 1978.05.26), succeeding as former Coadjutor Bishop-Prelate of Territorial Prelature of Jurua (Brazil) (1966.06.21 – 1967.02.07)

Suffragan Bishops of Cruzeiro do Sul
 Heinrich Rüth, C.S.Sp. (25 June 1987 - retired 7 December 1988), died 2006
 Luís Herbst, C.S.Sp. (born Germany) (7 December 1988 - 3 January 2001), previously Coadjutor Bishop-Prelate of Territorial Prelature of Jurua (1979.08.07 – 1987.06.25), (see) promoted and restyled Coadjutor Bishop of Cruzeiro do Sul (1987.06.25 – 1988.12.07)
 Mosé João Pontelo, C.S.Sp. (3 January 2001 - 19 September 2018), succeeding as former Coadjutor Bishop of Cruzeiro do Sul (Brazil) (1998.05.27 – 2001.01.03).
 Flávio Giovenale, S.D.B. (19 September 2018 – present)

Coadjutor bishops
Heinrich Rüth, C.S.Sp. (1966-1967), as Coadjutor Prelate
Luís Herbst, C.S.Sp. (1979-1988), with 1979-1987 as Coadjutor Prelate
Mosé João Pontelo, C.S.Sp. (1998-2001)

See also 
 List of Catholic dioceses in Brazil

References

Sources and external links 
 GCatholic - data for all sections

Roman Catholic Ecclesiastical Province of Porto Velho
Roman Catholic dioceses in Brazil
Roman Catholic dioceses and prelatures established in the 20th century
Religious organizations established in 1931